Woodside National Historic Site is the childhood home of former Canadian Prime Minister William Lyon Mackenzie King. King resided there from 1886 to 1893. The house is located in the city of Kitchener, Ontario, Canada. The house was built in 1853. A group of local citizens created the Mackenzie King Woodside Trust to preserve the house from demolition and acquire the property. The house has been restored to reflect the Victorian era, and is managed and interpreted as a unit of the national park system. The  site includes wooded grounds, gardens, and lawn.  A video presentation is shown about the King family and Woodside. Victorian period programs and special events are offered, but the house is open fewer than 60 days a year, on select dates from October to mid-December. The grounds are open year-round.

The house and the grounds were designated a National Historic Site in 1952.

See also
 List of historic places in Regional Municipality of Waterloo
 List of oldest buildings and structures in the Regional Municipality of Waterloo

References

External links
Parks Canada: Woodside National Historic Site

National Historic Sites in Ontario
Historic house museums in Ontario
William Lyon Mackenzie King
Tourist attractions in Kitchener, Ontario
Museums in Kitchener, Ontario
Houses in Kitchener, Ontario
History of Kitchener, Ontario
Buildings and structures completed in 1853